St. Francis Xavier College, is a private Catholic pre-school, primary, and a secondary school, located in San Juan de Pasto, Nariño, Colombia. The school was founded by the Society of Jesus in 1925. The kindergarten through seventh grade was opened in 1956, under the care of the Sisters of St. Joseph.

See also

 Education in Colombia
 List of schools in Colombia
 List of Jesuit schools

References  

Jesuit secondary schools in Colombia
Jesuit primary schools in Colombia
Educational institutions established in 1925
1925 establishments in Colombia